Bolshiye Bazy is a rural locality (a settlement) in Olkhovatskoye Urban Settlement, Olkhovatsky District, Voronezh Oblast, Russia. The population was 2,572 as of 2010. There are 19 streets.

Geography 
Bolshiye Bazy is located 4 km south of Olkhovatka (the district's administrative centre) by road. Olkhovatka is the nearest rural locality.

References 

Rural localities in Olkhovatsky District